Story circle may refer to:

 A group story sharing technique developed by the Student Nonviolent Coordinating Committee during the American Civil Rights Movement in the 1960s
 A screenwriting technique created by television producer Dan Harmon in the 1990s